89.3 Brigada News FM (DXZA 89.3 MHz) is an FM station owned and operated by Brigada Mass Media Corporation. Its studios and transmitter are located at Sinsuat Ave., Cotabato City.

References

External links 
 Brigada News FM Cotabato FB Page
 Brigada News FM Cotabato Website

Radio stations in Cotabato City
Radio stations established in 1994